Diosdado Lozano is an Equatoguinean Olympic middle-distance runner. He represented his country in the men's 1500 meters at the 1984 Summer Olympics. His time was a 4:34.71 in the first heat.

References 

1963 births
Living people
Equatoguinean male middle-distance runners
Olympic athletes of Equatorial Guinea
Athletes (track and field) at the 1984 Summer Olympics